Jimmy Olsen is a fictional character appearing in American comic books published by DC Comics. Olsen is most often portrayed as a young photojournalist working for the Daily Planet. He is close friends with Lois Lane and Clark Kent, and has a good working relationship with his boss Perry White. Olsen looks up to his coworkers as role models and parent figures. From 1954 to 1982, Olsen appeared in 222 issues of the comic series Superman's Pal Jimmy Olsen and Superman Family, in addition to the main Superman titles.

The character has appeared in most other media adaptations of Superman. He was portrayed by Tommy Bond in the two Superman film serials, Superman (1948) and Atom Man vs. Superman (1950). Jack Larson played the character on the Adventures of Superman television show; Marc McClure in the Superman films of the 1970s and 1980s, as well as the 1984 film Supergirl; Michael Landes in the first season of Lois and Clark: The New Adventures of Superman and Justin Whalin in the subsequent three seasons; Sam Huntington in the 2006 film Superman Returns; Aaron Ashmore in The CW's Smallville; and Michael Cassidy in the 2016 DC Extended Universe film Batman v Superman: Dawn of Justice. In the Arrowverse series Supergirl, he was portrayed by Mehcad Brooks.

Publication history

Creation and Early Appearances

An unnamed "office boy" with a bow tie appeared in the story "Superman's Phony Manager," published in Action Comics No. 6 (November 1938); it was retroactively considered to be Jimmy Olsen's first appearance. The character was first introduced as Jimmy Olsen by producer Bob Maxwell on The Adventures of Superman radio show on April 15, 1940. After eight early unnamed appearances in comics, Olsen first appeared as a named character in a story by Jerry Siegel and Joe Shuster titled "Superman versus The Archer" in Superman No. 13 (November–December 1941). He occasionally appeared as an office boy in Action Comics, Superman, and World's Finest Comics throughout the next decade,  and he made a notable appearance as the manager of a community baseball team in the 1946 radio serial Clan of the Fiery Cross. The first long story featuring the character, "King Jimmy Olsen," ran in the daily Superman newspaper strips from July 20-October 28, 1944.

Superman's Pal Jimmy Olsen (1954-74)

Following Jack Larson's portrayal on The Adventures of Superman TV series, Olsen was promoted from office boy to "cub reporter" beginning in Superman #86.  Later in 1954, Olsen received his own series, Superman's Pal Jimmy Olsen. The first issue introduced the Signal Watch, a high-frequency supersonic device that allowed Jimmy to contact Superman in case of emergency. Lucy Lane debuted as Jimmy's off-again, on-again love interest in issue #36. Jimmy and Lucy were occasionally married in "imaginary stories" such as "The Wedding of Jimmy Olsen" (issue #38) and The Amazing Story of Superman Red and Superman Blue!

The Weisinger Era 
Early adventures saw Olsen in a variety of slapstick adventures and strange transformations, such as Jimmy transforming into the giant "Turtle Boy" in issue #53. The stories in the title often featured particularly outlandish situations, ranging from Jimmy being hurled back in time to Krypton before its destruction in issue No. 36 to dealing frequently with gorillas of all sorts. During this period, Jimmy Olsen lived a glamorous life as "Superman's Pal" and even had his own (in-story) fan club. Beginning in 1958, Olsen gained the ability to temporarily transform into the superhero Elastic Lad by drinking a serum. As Elastic Lad, he was an honorary member of the Legion of Super-Heroes. When traveling to the Bottle City of Kandor, Superman and Jimmy donned the secret identities of Nightwing and Flamebird, respectively. He was promoted by editor Perry White to the status of "full-fledged reporter" in issue #124 (October 1969.)

Superman's Pal Jimmy Olsen was a best-seller throughout the 1960s; at its peak it was the #4 best-selling comic book with an estimated 520,000 copies sold each month. Reprints from the magazine were also featured in 80-Page Giant #2 and #13 (1964–65).

Jack Kirby's Fourth World

Jack Kirby's Fourth World storyline began in Jimmy Olsen comics in 1970, with issue No. 134. Kirby began by introducing a secret "D.N.A. Project" to create Mutated Humans for Good, adding "the Hairies" (a group of technology-equipped hippies), superbeings from other planets (proto-New Gods), Intergang, Darkseid, and the WGBS media executive Morgan Edge. Kirby also used the series as a vehicle to reintroduce Golden Age characters that he previously created at DC Comics, such as Guardian and the Newsboy Legion. Before the end of his run, Kirby wrote stories involving vampires, the Loch Ness Monster, Victor Volcanum, a fire-eating archcriminal, as well as a two-part story featured the comedian Don Rickles. Kirby left the series following issue #148.

Superman Family (1974-1982) 
With issue No. 164 (April–May 1974) the series was renamed The Superman Family. An anthology title that incorporated the recently cancelled series Supergirl (Volume 1) and Superman's Girl Friend, Lois Lane, Superman Family initially featured one new story about Jimmy Olsen, Lois Lane, or Supergirl, with the featured character in each issue narrating reprints of the other characters' stories. By the second series, Jimmy Olsen became an investigative reporter for WGBS-TV nicknamed "Mr. Action," featuring in urban crime stories that less frequently involved Superman. Olsen appeared in new stories in The Superman Family No. 164, 167, 170, 173, 176, 179, and 182–222. A number of Superman writers including Leo Dorfman and Cary Bates contributed scripts for the stories, and they were most often pencilled by Kurt Schaffenberger. The series ended with issue #222 (September 1982). Afterwards, Jimmy Olsen continued to appear in issues of Superman, Action Comics, World's Finest Comics, and DC Comics Presents, where a 29th-century descendant of Olsen became Superwoman.

Post-Crisis on Infinite Earths (1987-)
Following Crisis on Infinite Earths, Jimmy's prior history as a character was erased. Despite recent modernization efforts on Superman and his supporting characters, Jimmy Olsen has not been significantly changed in the Modern Age. He is still a cub reporter working for The Daily Planet, and is still friends with Superman. His look was made over as he stopped wearing bowties, and started wearing casual clothing (though this trend started in 1970s comics). An interesting alteration to the relationship was that Jimmy designed the signal watch himself, leading to his first meeting with Superman. Superman briefly considered confiscating the watch, but decided to trust Jimmy to use it responsibly.

While Jimmy's transformations no longer occur as regularly as they did in the Silver Age, Jimmy once became a type of "Elastic Lad" on contact with the Eradicator; this transformation, however, was extremely painful for Jimmy and has not appeared since. He also took the identity of "Turtle Boy" in a series of pizza commercials, made when he was temporarily laid off from the Planet.

In the 1990s, Jimmy quit the Planet in a dispute over a story and went to Metropolis broadcaster Galaxy Broadcasting, where he worked as an on-air investigative reporter. This change matured Jimmy somewhat, but he became more ambitious, as well as more brash and arrogant. He still stayed on good terms with both Clark and Lois, to the point where Jimmy was best man at their wedding. This period ended when he believed (wrongly) that he had discovered Superman's secret identity and said he would announce it live on air. He reconsidered his actions, but lost his job for wasting the timeslot. He was again rehired by the Planet.

Jimmy later came under the angry hand of the Alpha Centurion, an alternate universe dictator with a deep-seated hatred for Superman and eyes for Lois Lane. It was Jimmy who first uncovered his secret plot to control the world's finances through his company Aelius Industries, Inc.

Superman: Metropolis
Olsen is a central character in the twelve-part miniseries Superman: Metropolis (beginning June 2003). Written by Chuck Austen and illustrated by Danijel Zezelj, the series focuses on the futuristic technology unleashed in Metropolis by Brainiac in a previous storyline and how it affects the everyday lives of Metropolis citizens.

Jimmy takes a position as a regular star reporter for The Daily Planet, replacing the recently demoted Clark Kent. This caused a strain at the  Planet.

Countdown

Jimmy's story in the 2007–08 weekly series Countdown to Final Crisis begins with an investigation into the death of Duela Dent. Tying into the Death of the New Gods storyline, Jimmy starts to develop many superpowers, which he first discovers when he is attacked by Killer Croc while gathering information on Duela's death. As the story progresses he tries to uncover the origin of these powers and starts to discover their potential limitlessness in stories which mimic the Silver Age Superman's Pal Jimmy Olsen adventures. Briefly operating as the superhero Mr. Action, Jimmy is unable to command the respect of established superheroes in the Justice League and Teen Titans. He gives up on this particular avenue. One of these powers allows Jimmy to realize the identities of some superheroes, such as Robin and Superman, who requests that he take care of Krypto.

Jimmy is eventually tracked down by the New God Forager, with whom he begins a romantic relationship. Forager informs him that Jimmy has become a soulcatcher for the spirits of dying New Gods. The Monitor known as Solomon later tells him that his new powers are the consequence of Darkseid using Jimmy as a host for powers he wishes to use to recreate the universe in his image, knowing that "Superman's pal" is one of the world's most well-protected citizens. Later, as the events of Countdown begin to come to their close, Jimmy becomes a more confidently powerful character and is reunited with the series' other cast members on a mission to stop Karate Kid's disease from becoming a pandemic of apocalyptic proportions. Unfortunately, they fail, and the Morticoccus virus devastates an alternate Earth. Upon return to their Earth, Jimmy is captured by Mary Marvel, who had been manipulated towards evil by Darkseid. When Superman comes to save Jimmy, Darkseid takes control of the powers within him, causing Jimmy to radiate Kryptonite radiation, until Ray Palmer manages to rewire Darkseid's control from inside of Jimmy. Jimmy then transforms into a giant turtle-like creature, and prepares to take on Darkseid himself. Darkseid overcomes Jimmy, and prepares to kill him. Ray Palmer then comes out of Jimmy with the New God soul battery, and destroys it, returning Jimmy to normal.

Superman's Pal, Jimmy Olsen Special

During Superman's fight with Atlas, Jimmy witnesses a mysterious figure hovering over the fight. After some encouraging words from Clark Kent, he decides to take two weeks off to investigate.

He tracks down a figure connected with the past of Jonathan Drew and is told the story of how Jonathan became Codename: Assassin. His informant is quickly executed by Codename: Assassin who then tries to kill Jimmy. Jimmy is able to avoid being killed and is apparently shielded from Codename: Assassin's telepathy due to his own many physical transformations over the years.

Jimmy goes to Project Cadmus and speaks to Dubbilex, who tells him the story about the death of the original Guardian at the hands of Codename: Assassin and how cloning is such an imperfect science that the only viable clone alive went into hiding in the desert. Dubbilex then dies from injuries sustained in an earlier conflict with Codename: Assassin. Jimmy heads south to the town of Warpath, AZ, managing to avoid conflict with Codename: Assassin on the way.

Upon arriving in Warpath, Jimmy interviews the sheriff, Greg Saunders, who evades his questions. Jimmy follows him after dark and sees Saunders working with the last Guardian clone. He then confronts the clone at his home and the two speak.

With his two weeks up, Jimmy returns to Metropolis horrified from learning that a faction within the U.S. military is actively plotting to kill Superman.

Willing to do anything to uncover the conspiracy behind Project 7734, Jimmy uses an anonymous chat server and gets in contact with Erik/Amazing Woman from Infinity Inc., who claims to have information useful to Jimmy. Despite being actively pursued by Codename: Assassin, who goes so far as to place bugs in his house, Jimmy goes to the appointment, only to find Erik's house burned to the ground.

Jimmy pulls Erik out, who with his dying breath, shifts to his more reliable and powerful Erika form. Erik gives him Natasha Irons' number. Natasha then contacts Jimmy, telling him about the plans of General Sam Lane, his outworldly fortress and his capture, and use of a Planet Breaker weapon of Captain Atom, now codenamed Project Breach (due to his similarity to Tim Zanetti's fate).

Finally ready to uncover the truth, Jimmy is openly confronted by Codename: Assassin, who until that point had merely followed him closely. Jimmy uses his signal watch to call Mon-El. Jimmy is shot twice in the chest by Codename: Assassin, and sinks into the ocean. Despite surviving his assassination attempt, Jimmy decides to fake his death, having his documents planted on a heavily disfigured corpse. With no one knowing about his survival, Jimmy moves into the old Pemberton Camera Factory, sharing the results of his now-unhindered investigations with Perry and Mon-El.

Action Comics backup and Jimmy Olsen
DC Comics has reported in solicits that Nick Spencer and R.B. Silva will be producing a monthly 10-page backup feature in Action Comics chronicling the adventures of Jimmy Olsen in Metropolis. Reported story topics include an alien civilization choosing Metropolis as the base of a major cultural celebration, and the introduction of Chloe Sullivan (from the Smallville television series) to the DCU proper. In the latest arc, he goes on a charity date with a girl named Maggie, only to discover that she somehow has ties to Mr. Mxyzptlk, and that she wants to marry him.

The last three chapters of the story are told in the self-titled one-shot, Jimmy Olsen.

Superman's Pal Jimmy Olsen, Vol. 2 (2019-2020) 
Beginning with a cover date of September 2019, DC Comics published a 12-part comedic miniseries that restored some elements of the 1954 series to the main DC Comics timeline. Jimmy was once again shown as Turtle Boy and Elastic Lad, and his antics, glamorous lifestyle as Superman's pal, and strange transformations were depicted as a source of streaming-media ad revenue that was keeping the Daily Planet afloat.  The series explored Jimmy's siblings Janie and Julian, his family's historic relations with the Luthor family, a plot involving the attempted murder and faked death of Olsen, and a marriage in Gorilla City that Jimmy subsequently forgot to annul. The series poked fun at DC Comics' own history, including a sequence in which Jimmy angered Batman by suggesting a phone-in campaign to decide whether Robin lived or died. By the end of the series, Jimmy received a new Signal Watch and became the publisher of the Daily Planet.

The series was written by Matt Fraction, drawn by Steve Lieber, colored by Nathan Fairbairn, and lettered by Clayton Cowles. A collected edition titled Superman's Pal Jimmy Olsen: Who Killed Jimmy Olsen? was published in September 2020, and it received an "honorable mention" in Publishers Weekly's year-end critics poll.

Powers, abilities, and equipment

Jimmy possesses a watch which emits a high-pitched signal only Superman can hear. In a 2010 story, he claimed it stopped working some time in the past, never worked particularly well in the first place, and contacted Superman through Morse code now, anyway, but still wore it for show.

Mostly during the Silver Age of Comic Books, Jimmy would find himself temporarily transformed, for better or worse, or undergo a disguise for various purposes. The variety of transformations Jimmy received during the Silver Age is often homaged or parodied in later comics and adaptations featuring the character – for instance, in JLA: The Nail, Jimmy cites three of these transformations as his motivations behind backing Luthor's bill to outlaw metahumans and in Countdown, Jimmy is used as a spirit container for the deceased New Gods, causing him to exhibit strange powers, albeit uncontrollably, with other stories simply making passing references.

 Speed Demon – In 1956, a month before the debut of Barry Allen as the new Flash, Jimmy drank a potion produced by a Professor Claude and briefly gained super-speed.
 Radioactive – After being exposed to a radioactive substance, Jimmy began to irradiate everything in his presence.
 Super-Brain – Jimmy briefly evolved into a "man of the future" with superhuman mental powers.
 Monstrous beard growth — The machinations of the sinister Beard Band cause Jimmy to grow an immense beard.
 Gorilla – When Jimmy switched minds with a gorilla, he went about his reporting duties as a gorilla in Jimmy's clothes.
 Elastic Lad – As Elastic Lad, Jimmy by serum or by alien virus could sometimes stretch himself, akin to the Elongated Man or Plastic Man. As Elastic Lad, Jimmy was inducted as an Honorary Member of the Legion of Super-Heroes. In the Post-Crisis on Infinite Earths continuity, Jimmy was afflicted with uncontrollable and painful elasticity by the Eradicator. It had to be genetically edited out.
 Alien-form – Aliens transformed Jimmy into a telepathic Jovian for a week. Fortunately, this turned out to be a Jovian week, which is much shorter than an Earth week, about 70 hours.
 Fire-Breather – An accident involving an experiment gives Jimmy fire-breath.
 Human Octopus – After eating an extraterrestrial fruit, Jimmy grew four extra arms. According to Superman, this was actually a hallucination, but Jimmy suspected that Superman said this to teach him a lesson since Jimmy had foolishly ignored advice from the Man of Steel that would have saved him a lot of trouble.
 Genie – Jimmy found a genie's lamp and was tricked into replacing its villainous occupant.
 Wolf-Man – In the vein of the 1957 Michael Landon film I Was a Teenage Werewolf, Jimmy found himself transformed into a werewolf.
 Woman – Jimmy would occasionally go undercover dressed as a woman in No. 44, No. 67, No. 84, and No. 159. Grant Morrison paid a brief homage to this in the JLA: Earth 2 graphic novel and in All-Star Superman.
 Morbidly Obese – Jimmy tried to get fat in an attempt to stop a jewel smuggling and to impress a circus fat lady.
 Giant Turtle Man – One of Jimmy's most frequently cited transformations was that of his turning into a giant turtle man.
 Human Porcupine – After rejecting the romantic advances of an imp from the Fifth Dimension.
 Flamebird – This is the name he took as a costumed superhero, with Superman disguised as Nightwing, in the shrunken Kryptonian city of Kandor. These names were inspired by two native Kryptonian birds, the nightwing and the flamebird, but the relationship between Nightwing and Flamebird intentionally paralleled the crime-fighting team Batman (a night-winged creature) and Robin (a flame-colored bird).
 Bizarro Jimmy – Although Jimmy has a counterpart on Bizarro World, he was briefly turned into a Bizarro himself.
 Hippie – Investigating a colony of hippies at "Guru Kama's Dream Pad", Jimmy grew a beard and participated in a mock "hate-in". On the cover of this story's issue, Jimmy is wielding a sign that says "Superman is a freak-out!"
 Viking – Jimmy put on Viking armor and mistakenly thought he had been transported 1,000 years backward in time.
Steelman – after a volcanic eruption hurls Jimmy and an experimental inter-dimensional travel device into an alternate universe, Jimmy develops his own superpowers as a result of the transit to the (unnamed) "Earth-X" but is vulnerable to fragments of Mount Tipton from his own universe ("Tiptonite"). He adopts a fusion Superman/Batman outfit and launches his own superhero career as Steelman, facing a Joker-masked Clark Kent, secretly the leader of the LUTHAR League before his return to his own universe of origin.
 Ultra Olsen – Jimmy gained from Professor Lang and his father 2 halves of to the Magic Medallion of the Mayans that, when fused back together, granted him "the Powers of the Mayan Gods". While he wore it, he possessed super strength, invulnerability, anti-gravity power, and lightning vision. It was revealed the amulet had a limited charge and required recharge from absorbed kinetic energy. Jimmy destroyed the amulet with his lightning vision after the second time he used it.
 Super Jimmy - A Superman version of Jimmy .
 Colossal Olsen - is a version of Colossal Boy.
 Red Headed Beatle - is an old version of Jimmy from 1,000BC.
 Taxi Jimmy - is a taxi driver.
 Astro Jimmy - An astronaut version of Jimmy Olsen.
  Old Olsen - is an old gramps vision of Jimmy. 
 Mummy Jimmy - Jimmy Olsen was turned into a mummy.
  Jock Olsen - is a high school Jimmy Olsen.
Double Olsen is a captive double of Jimmy but Jimmy wanted to kill him with the doubles weakness kriptonite .
Detective Olsen - is a detective Jimmy wanted to solve a case.
Batman Olsen - is Jimmy wearing Batman's suit. 
Imp Jimmy - Jimmy finally found a way to take Mr. Mxyzptlk's powers. Even if he said his name backwards he still had his powers; he turned Mr. Mxyzptlk into a tiger.

Other versions

JLA: The Nail

JLA: The Nail is set in an alternate reality in which a nail punctures a tire on the Kents' car, preventing them from finding the spaceship containing a baby Kal-El; subsequently, Kal-El never becomes Superman. Jimmy Olsen, an aide to Metropolis Mayor Lex Luthor, is revealed to be the primary villain. Having discovered Superman's spaceship and using DNA samples to create numerous Bizarro clones, Luthor grafts Kryptonian DNA onto subjects who either die instantly or mutate before death, except Olsen. The graft gives Olsen superpowers, but also drives him insane, mentally transforming him into a Kryptonian determined to replace human life with Kryptonian life. Olsen plays up the public's fear of superheroes via propaganda, encouraging the popular view of them as alien invaders rather than the enhanced humans of the Justice Society, hoping to have them imprisoned so he can use their DNA as well in an attempt to create a stable template to create other new Kryptonians.

When his secret identity is revealed, he engages in a fight with the Justice League that spills into the local countryside. An Amish farmer attempts to stop Olsen but is blasted by his heat vision—which reveals that the farmer is the (now adult) Kal-El. In this reality, an Amish couple had raised Kal-El as a pacifist encouraged to ignore worldly affairs so that he could walk in righteousness. Olsen asks Kal-El to join him, claiming that they are virtually brothers with the same DNA. When Kal-El refuses, Olsen kills Kal-El's foster parents. During the subsequent battle, Jimmy's body rejects the Kryptonian DNA, causing him to disintegrate. His last words to Kal-El are: "We should have been friends". The Justice League asks Kal-El to join them, recognising that his DNA had just been a contributing factor to a chain of events that had driven Jimmy insane rather than bringing out something that was not there before.

Frank Miller's Batman titles
In Frank Miller's 1986 graphic novel The Dark Knight Returns, an older Jimmy Olsen (James, as he is now called) is featured as the writer of "Truth to Power", a Daily Planet article that recalls the age of heroes. In the 2001 sequel Batman: The Dark Knight Strikes Again, Olsen appears on various TV shows, where he attempts to reveal that the current President is a holographic projection. His attempts to publicize the truth are halted by Lex Luthor as Metropolis is destroyed (killing hundreds, including Jimmy, Lois, and Perry) by BrainIAC.

A young Jimmy Olsen makes an appearance in All Star Batman & Robin, the Boy Wonder No. 6. He helps Vicki Vale, whom he appears to be attracted to, escape from a hospital and giving her files on Batman and the Flying Graysons. This incarnation is described as a cub reporter for the Gotham Gazette as opposed to his regular position at the Daily Planet and as 'Superman's pal'.

Superman: Red Son
In Superman: Red Son, written by Mark Millar, Jimmy is depicted as an agent of the CIA, eventually becoming the director. He joins Dr. Lex Luthor in his presidential bid and becomes Vice President.

Superman: Kal
In Superman: Kal, Jamie Olsen of the Middle Ages is an early alchemist, working with blacksmith's apprentice Kal to forge a suit of armor for Baron Luthor using metal acquired from a 'silver egg' that fell from the sky years ago. Kal is killed in his final effort to slay Luthor. In the epilogue, Olsen tells his apprentice Merlin of his friendship with Kal, noting that Kal's last action was to hide away his indestructible sword until it would be needed.

Superman: Emperor Joker
In the alternate timeline created by Joker, Jimmy serves in Joker's imperial court as "Gravedigger Lad", a cheerful and happy-go-lucky young man of clearly limited intelligence, armed with an overlarge shovel (to dig graves). He humorously says, at one point, "I'm happy to be here ... I'm happy to be anywhere." He also attempts to invoke the powers of Shazam at one point, but this fails.

All-Star Superman
In Grant Morrison and Frank Quitely's All-Star Superman series, Jimmy is a successful reporter for the Daily Planet. He has a regular column in which he takes on unusual jobs for a day. Issue No. 4 of the series focuses on Jimmy and his adventures as the one-day director of the DNA P.R.O.J.E.C.T., a reference to the Jack Kirby-era Jimmy Olsen series. After Superman is temporarily turned evil by black kryptonite, Jimmy saves him by injecting himself with a drug that briefly turns him into a version of Doomsday. In the final issue, Jimmy manages to stop Lex Luthor's deranged niece from destroying Metropolis by giving her the one thing she really wants: free publicity.

Flashpoint
In the alternate timeline of the Flashpoint event, Jimmy Olsen is an agent of Cyborg sent to spy on the Amazons.

He is with Lois Lane reporting on a fashion show in Montmartre when the Atlanteans flooded Europe. Jimmy is one of the thousands to perish in Western Europe. He tries to save an old man; Lois survives by getting into a church steeple. Jimmy's place at the Resistance was then taken by Lois, after she got his camera, revealed to be a communications device that can transform into different forms for concealment.

DC Universe Online: Legends
In the limited series DC Universe Online: Legends, Jimmy Olsen is captured (alongside Lois Lane and Perry White) at the Daily Planet by Brainiac but is saved by Superman, with Lex Luthor in possession of the canister containing them. Later, Jimmy becomes one of the people who have gained metahuman abilities from Braniac's Exobytes, transforming his body into a large being with reptile-like skin.

Superman Beyond
Taking place decades after Jimmy's final appearance in Justice League Unlimited, the Superman Beyond one-shot features an elderly version of the character. It is revealed that Jimmy purchased the Daily Planet after Perry White's death, and he runs a successful media empire.

Injustice: Gods Among Us
Jimmy appears in the comic book prequel to Injustice: Gods Among Us. He is killed by the Joker while on a stakeout with Lois Lane, who is subsequently kidnapped by the Joker.

Earth 2
Jimmy Olsen is a hyper-intelligent knowledge-assimilator known as Accountable in the Earth 2 series.

He would later take on the alias of Doctor Impossible.

In other media

Radio
On the Superman radio series, Jack Kelk and Jack Grimes portrayed Jimmy Olsen.

Television

Adventures of Superman
On the Adventures of Superman television series (starring George Reeves), Jimmy Olsen was portrayed by Jack Larson, who appeared as the cub reporter from 1952 to 1958. Largely because of the popularity of Larson and his portrayal of the character, National Comics Publications (DC Comics) decided in 1954 to create Superman's Pal Jimmy Olsen, a regular title featuring Jimmy as the leading character. Decades later in 1996, Larson portrayed an unnaturally aged Jimmy Olsen in an episode of Lois & Clark: The New Adventures of Superman.

Lois & Clark: The New Adventures of Superman

On the television series Lois & Clark: The New Adventures of Superman, Jimmy Olsen was portrayed by Michael Landes in the first season and Justin Whalin for the rest of the series' run. The reason cited behind the change is that Landes looked too much like Dean Cain as well as to emphasize Jimmy's youth. Landes played Olsen as a cocksure, sarcastic Generation X character, who often seemed like he was very sure of himself although usually, the opposite was true. Whalin gave a portrayal closer to previous incarnations of the character, playing Jimmy as a lovably naive rookie. When Whalin took over the role, more emphasis was placed on Jimmy's love-life and he would frequently seek out Lois, Clark and Perry's advice on these matters. Whalin's Olsen was described as being a computer whiz and these talents often came in useful to Lois and Clark/Superman, particularly in the episode 'Virtually Destroyed' where Jimmy's computing abilities come in handy as Lois and Superman battle a villain inside of a virtual reality simulator. Jimmy's home life and background is described in some detail throughout the course of the show. Although we never see her, some references are made to Jimmy's mother who is described as being overweight and having allergies. Jimmy's father Jack Olsen is a James Bond-like secret agent for the fictional National Intelligence Agency (N.I.A.) and the episode 'The Dad who Came in from the Cold' is entirely devoted to this character.

Smallville
In Smallville, the series incarnation of Jimmy Olsen is first referenced in season 2 by Chloe Sullivan (Allison Mack), when she refers to a "cute boy" whose "name is Jimmy", whom she met in Metropolis that made her forget all about Smallville for the summer.  His name is first given in season 4 when Chloe confides to Lana Lang that he was her "first time". In season 6's premiere "Zod", Jimmy appears in person (portrayed by Aaron Ashmore) on the staff of the Daily Planet and prefers to be called "James", and frequently addresses Clark Kent as "CK". As season 6 progresses, Jimmy and Chloe rekindle their old romance again.  At first, Jimmy is jealous of Clark but their relationship becomes friendly after Clark reunites him with Chloe in the season 6 episode "Trespass".

In season 7, Jimmy is still at the Daily Planet working as a budding news photographer, his relationship with Chloe is going through a rough phase due to Chloe's secret new-found ability caused by an amount of Kryptonite meteor in her bloodstream. They broke up in a very emotional scene in the episode "Cure" since Chloe was unable to share her secret with him.  Meanwhile, Kara Zor-El (Laura Vandervoort), daughter of Zor-El and Clark's cousin, has developed a crush on Jimmy and they become friends. Jimmy is smitten by her and teams up with her in episodes such as "Cure" and "Lara". They are in a relationship briefly, but they break up and Jimmy is shown to be in a relationship again with Chloe in the episode "Sleeper". In the season finale, he proposed to her, but she was arrested before she had the time to answer.

In season 8's premiere "Odyssey", Jimmy is seen waiting for Chloe at the Talon. Chloe arrives and Jimmy tells her that he is taking his proposal back because it might risk what they have between them. But Chloe disagrees and reveals that she does love Jimmy and she will gladly be his wife. She kisses Jimmy passionately afterward. In "Committed", Jimmy admits to Chloe that he lied about his father being a Manhattan investment banker — his father is "a part-time mechanic and full-time alcoholic in Oklahoma City", and he has never even met his mother. He apologizes to Chloe for lying, feeling unworthy of her, but she easily forgives him and they kiss. In "Bride", Jimmy marries Chloe in the Kent barn, but the wedding reception is interrupted by Doomsday, who nearly kills Jimmy and kidnaps Chloe.  Jimmy's injury is so critical that he must be taken to a hospital in Star City. In "Turbulence", Jimmy sees Davis Bloome (Doomsday's human form) murder a drunk driver and becomes almost violently obsessed with proving it. Davis convinces Chloe that Jimmy is hallucinating from high doses of painkillers, ultimately destroying Chloe and Jimmy's marriage and leaving Jimmy addicted to his pain medication. In season 8's finale "Doomsday", Jimmy finally reconciles with Chloe after learning Clark's secret and understanding that Chloe only stayed with Davis to calm the beast within and protect Clark. As Chloe gives Jimmy a passionate kiss, Jimmy is mortally wounded by a jealous Davis, who overhears their conversation and flies into a murderous rage despite being already stripped of the Doomsday persona. Jimmy manages to pushes Davis into a spike and kills him, and reaffirms love to Chloe before succumbing to injury.  At his funeral, his full name is revealed to be Henry James Olsen. Chloe entrusts his camera to his underage younger brother (portrayed by Ryan Harder). While the younger Olsen's name is not mentioned, the boy is wearing a bow tie, leading to the possibility that this is the actual comic book Jimmy Olsen (James Bartholomew Olsen), who will befriend Superman.

In season 9 finale, Clark has a premonition about the future in 2013 where Lois Lane calls out to an "Olsen", likely calling the younger brother Olsen.  In the season 10 episode "Homecoming", Clark accidentally time-travels to the future in 2017 (thanks to Brainiac 5) and reads a Daily Planet article that listed "Jimmy Olsen". In the ending scene of the series finale set seven years into the future, the adult version of the younger Olsen (also portrayed by Aaron Ashmore) makes an appearance as a fresh news photographer working with Lois and Clark at the Daily Planet, wearing a flat cap, sweater vest, and bow tie.

The 2008 DVD box set for the seventh season of Smallville includes a 22-minute featurette, entitled Jimmy on Jimmy, which is a round-table discussion featuring four of the six surviving actors at the time who had portrayed Jimmy Olsen in live action: Jack Larson (Adventures of Superman), Marc McClure (Superman film series, Supergirl film), Sam Huntington (Superman Returns), and Aaron Ashmore (Smallville). Michael Landes and Justin Whalin (both from Lois & Clark: The New Adventures of Superman) did not participate.

Arrowverse
Jimmy Olsen appears in the TV series set in the Arrowverse portrayed by Mehcad Brooks. Olsen appears in the series Supergirl as a former Daily Planet photographer who becomes the new art director at CatCo in the first episode. This depiction of the character is African-American and calls himself "James" rather than "Jimmy". Also unlike most versions of him, he is shown to be more confident, independent, and take-charge. In the pilot, Olsen reveals that he knows Kara's secret, and knows that she is Superman's cousin. Superman actually suggested that Olsen move to National City to keep an eye on her. Unlike his comic-book counterpart for most of his history, Olsen also knows Clark's secret. Olsen also revealed to have a tragic past; he lost his father to criminals when he was a child. Due to Olsen's repressed anger towards crimes because of his father's death and because his father was a war hero, he becomes the vigilante called Guardian. James is appointed head of CatCo in National City when Cat Grant moves to Metropolis. In the fifth season, CatCo is bought by Andrea Rojas's company Obsidian North. Exerting pressure as the new CEO, Andrea forces Olsen to report on stories based on profitability as opposed to truth. Olsen resigns and becomes editor of his hometown paper, The Calvintown Gazette.

Animation
Jack Grimes reprised his role as Jimmy Olsen in The New Adventures of Superman.
In the Super Friends animated series, he "appears" in the second episode of The World's Greatest Super Friends season, 'Lex Luthor Strikes Back', with Lois Lane. It was not Jimmy at all, but Lex Luthor's henchman Orville Gump in disguise.
Mark L. Taylor voiced Jimmy Olsen in the 1988 animated adaptation of Superman.

In Superman: The Animated Series, part of the DC Animated Universe, Jimmy was voiced by David Kaufman. One episode was called "Superman's Pal" as an homage to the classic comic series, and Superman gave Jimmy the signal watch by the end of the episode. Another allusion to the comics made in the show was seen in the second-season episode "Mxyzpixilated", where Mr. Mxyzptlk turns all the employees of the Daily Planet into animals. Jimmy is turned into a turtle, possibly as a homage.
Jimmy returns in Justice League, again voiced by David Kaufman. He makes a brief appearance in Superman's nightmare in the episode "Only a Dream", being accidentally killed by his uncontrollable strength. He also makes a cameo at Superman's funeral in "Hereafter".
Jimmy appeared again in several cameo appearances in Justice League Unlimited. In the episode "Question Authority", Huntress used sleeping gas on him, tied him up, taped his mouth shut, and used the signal watch to attract Superman. In the episode "Chaos at the Earth's Core", several heroes battle a giant turtle that has a thatch of red hair; Bruce Timm has confirmed this is a reference to Jimmy's Giant Turtle Boy persona "but it was more economical time-wise to have him revert to cute little turtle than naked, confused photographer.".
Jimmy appears in The Batman two-part episode "The Batman/Superman Story", voiced by Jack DeSena. In season five's premiere, he and Dick Grayson have a back and forth discussion about Batman and Superman from their sides of view. While Jimmy favors Superman to Batman, he is still impressed by Batman's Batmobile.
Jimmy Olsen appears in Batman: The Brave and the Bold, voiced by Alexander Polinsky. The episode "Battle of the Super Heroes!" references him with his misadventures of him being transformed into a giant turtle, and having quills thanks to Mxyzptlk. In the episode's beginning, Jimmy receives a new signal watch, supposedly from Superman. When a red kryptonite-infected Superman starts causing terror, Jimmy becomes angry and almost smashes his signal watch, until Batman stops him and reveals that the signal watch has red kryptonite in it and was sent by Lex Luthor. Jimmy next appears in the teaser of the episode "Triumvirate of Terror!", where he acts as a sports commentator in the baseball match between the Justice League International and the Legion of Doom.
Jimmy appears in the Young Justice episode "Depths".
Jimmy appears in the "Tales of Metropolis" segment of DC Nation Shorts, voiced by Elisha Yaffe.
Jimmy appears in Justice League Action, voiced by Max Mittelman.
Jimmy appears in DC Super Hero Girls television series, voiced by Ben Giroux.
Jimmy appears in Young Justice: Phantoms, voiced by Dee Bradley Baker.
 Jimmy will appear in the upcoming HBO Max and Cartoon Network animated series My Adventures with Superman.

Film

Christopher Reeve/Brandon Routh series
 In the four motion pictures starring Christopher Reeve, beginning with Superman, Jimmy Olsen was portrayed by Marc McClure. McClure reprised his role as Jimmy Olsen in the 1984 spin-off movie Supergirl, making McClure the only actor and Olsen the only character to appear in all five Superman films of the 1978–1987 era. McClure also appears as his character in the toy commercial for the Super Powers Collection.
 In Bryan Singer's 2006 film Superman Returns, a spiritual-sequel to the two original Superman films, Jimmy Olsen is portrayed by Sam Huntington, an older and more confident, yet goofier portrayal of the character who finds it difficult to get a good shot or get any photos published. In a deleted scene included in the DVD release, a slightly inebriated Olsen is seen to complain to Clark about the fact he has not had a photo printed in several months. In the film, Jack Larson, who portrayed Jimmy in the Adventures of Superman television series, plays Bo, a bartender who talks to Clark and Jimmy. Singer originally offered Shawn Ashmore the role, but the actor declined due to his commitments to X-Men: The Last Stand. Ashmore's twin brother Aaron Ashmore played Jimmy in Smallville.

DC Extended Universe
 Jimmy Olsen is portrayed by Michael Cassidy in Batman v Superman: Dawn of Justice. Similar to the Superman: Red Son version, he appears as a CIA operative, but poses as a photographer during Lois Lane's journey to Africa. During an interview, he is exposed as an agent and killed after terrorists find a tracking device hidden within his camera.

Other appearances
 Jimmy Olsen, as an unnamed, rather Neumanesque-looking office boy, appeared in the Superman animated short film "Showdown", where he is voiced by actor Jack Mercer.
 The first actor to portray Jimmy Olsen in a live-action format was Tommy Bond, who co-starred with Kirk Alyn (Superman / Clark Kent) and Noel Neill (Lois Lane) in the film serials Superman (1948) and Atom Man vs. Superman (1950).
 Jimmy is played again by David Kaufman in the movie Superman: Brainiac Attacks.
 Jimmy appeared in Superman: Doomsday, played by voice actor Adam Wylie. He is with Lois reporting the battle between Superman and Doomsday and is one of the characters followed through their grieving process; his being quitting the Daily Planet and becoming a paparazzi photographer. Lois tries to get him to come back and help her investigate Superman's supposed return, which he refuses due to him foolishly liking his new life. He does eventually help Lois after seeing Toyman dead by "Superman's" hand and they discover that this Superman is a clone made by Lex Luthor and later runs alongside Lois during "Superman's" fight with, who Jimmy calls, Rocker Superman, the real Superman. After their fight, Jimmy is happy to see the real Superman alive when Superman confirms it is him through a kiss with Lois.
 He appeared in Justice League: The New Frontier. He has no dialogue, therefore no voice actor. He is always shown with Lois, and is almost killed during the final battle. He tries to take dangerous pictures during the battle.
 Jimmy appeared in Justice League: Crisis on Two Earths. He is in the antimatter Earth as Ultraman's "Pal" and was used to bait him out. He tries to take on Luthor and Superman with super powers in battle. This Jimmy Olsen has the powers of flight, superhuman strength and durability, but despite them, he was easily overpowered by Superman. He was arrested and taken to jail along with Ultraman. In promotional materials for the film, this version of Jimmy is referred to as Mr. Action. He was voiced by Richard Green.
 Jimmy appears in the movie All-Star Superman voiced by Matthew Gray Gubler.
 Jimmy appears in Justice League: Doom, with David Kaufman reprising his role from the Superman animated series. He has a brief speaking role as he and Lois Lane are outside the Daily Planet reporting a possible suicide jump. Jimmy is the one who identifies the jumper as a former reporter from the Daily Planet. It is really Metallo in disguise, who proceeds to shoot Superman with a kryptonite bullet.
 He appears in Superman vs. The Elite voiced again by David Kaufman.
 In Batman: The Dark Knight Returns, Jimmy is mentioned in a news segment where he announces that the fourth year of the TV writers' strike won't interfere with this year's television season.
 Jimmy appears in Superman: Unbound voiced by Alexander Gould. He doesn't have a major role in the film and is present mainly as one of the cameo characters in the film. He does serve a brief purpose as Lois asks him to use his signal watch to call Supergirl, who he immediately has an attraction to.
 He appears in Justice League: Throne of Atlantis. Although it was a non-speaking role, his voice was credited by Patrick Cavanaugh.
 An alternate universe version of Jimmy Olsen appeared in Justice League: Gods and Monsters, voiced by Yuri Lowenthal. He is part of Lois Lane's reporter team and snucks into the morgue of the deceased scientists to get some pictures before getting arrested.
 Jimmy Olsen appears in the film Lego DC Comics Super Heroes: The Flash, voiced by Eric Bauza.
 Jimmy Olsen appears in the 2018 film The Death of Superman and its sequel Reign of the Supermen, with Max Mittelman reprising his role.
 Jimmy Olsen appears in the 2020 film Superman: Red Son, voiced by Phil Morris as Luthor's faithful aide and Vice President before Luthor resigns and appoints him President of the USA.
 Jimmy Olsen appears in the 2021 film Injustice, voice by Zach Callison.
 Jimmy Olsen appears in the 2021 film Space Jam: A New Legacy. He was seen at the train station in the DC part of the Warner Bros. 3000 "server-verse" when a runaway train that Daffy Duck caused sped by him and Clark Kent.

Video games
 In Superman 64, he is trapped, along with Lois Lane and Professor Emil Hamilton, by Lex Luthor. Superman has to save him and his friends in this game.
 In Superman: Shadow of Apokolips for the GameCube and PlayStation 2, Jimmy (again voiced by David Kaufman) makes some minor appearances and only seen in the story between game-play. He is seen in the bibliography section of the game.
 In DC Universe Online, Jimmy appears as a supporting character for the heroes, voiced by Brandon Young.
 Jimmy Olsen appears as a NPC in Lego DC Super Villains with Max Mittelman reprising his role.

Cultural references
 The Spin Doctors had a minor hit with their song "Jimmy Olsen's Blues" on their 1991 album Pocket Full of Kryptonite, in which they portrayed Jimmy Olsen as infatuated with Lois Lane and jealous of Superman, a problem which he hoped to solve with the aforementioned "pocket full of Kryptonite". In the period after the song became popular, artist Jon Bogdanove, who at the time was the regular penciler on the Superman: The Man of Steel comic book series, would occasionally depict Jimmy wearing a Spin Doctors T-shirt.

References

External links
Jimmy Olsen at Comic Vine

Characters created by Jerry Siegel
Characters created by Joe Shuster
DC Comics sidekicks
Comics characters introduced in 1938
DC Comics male characters
Fictional photographers
Fictional reporters
Superman characters
Flamebird